The Hedareb or T'bdawe are an ethnic group native to northwestern Eritrea. They are a subgroup of the Beja. They are more diverse than the other Eritrean ethics; one subgroup speaks the traditional Beja language, which belongs to the Cushitic branch of the Afro-Asiatic family, while another is more closely related to Sudanese Hadendoa. They are among the least-researched groups in Eritrea.

The Hedareb people live in northwestern Eritrea and extend as far as the borders with east Sudan. Nomadic or semi-nomadic pastoralists, they typically migrate seasonally with their herds of camels, goats and sheep.

Language
The Hedareb speak the Beja language or Tigre language as a mother tongue. In addition to their variety of Beja, known as Hedareb or T’badwe, most Hedareb people also speak at least one other language, typically for a larger group Tigre, and for a small group Arabic as well.

Society
Hedareb society is hierarchical, and is traditionally organized into clans and subclans. Hedarebs are a Muslim group, and most are Sunni Muslims. Marriages are typically arranged to maximize alliances between extended families. It is customary for the groom's family to pay a bride price of five to twelve goats, and a varying amount of money, or as much as 70 camels.

Sociologist Abdulkader Saleh Mohammad writes that the Hedareb have been excluded from state conceptions of Eritrean nationhood, and have become a marginalized group with many members who do not feel connected to the Eritrean nation-state.

Laws 
As Muslim people, the Hedareb follow Sharia law in most matters.

In the nineteenth century, blood feuds marked by chains of revenge killings existed among Hedareb groups; unlike those among neighboring groups, they were rarely resolved by the payment of blood money, possibly because the Hedareb had fewer trading practices. Also distinctively, killing one's wife was traditionally punished by death, while killing one's children went unpunished. Rape of a noblewoman by a serf was punishable by death, while rape of serfs by nobles was tolerated.

See also
Amarar tribe
Bisharin tribe

Notes

References

External links
YouTube videos of traditional Hedareb dance: , 
Eritrean Ministry of Information: Traditional Wedding Ceremonies of the Hedareb Part I  and Part II

Further reading

Hadareb
Ethnic groups in Sudan
Ethnic groups in Eritrea
Ethnic groups in Africa
Muslim communities in Africa
Sudanese people of Beja descent